Sir Gilbert James Morley Longden (16 April 1902 – 16 October 1997) was a British Conservative politician.

He qualified as a solicitor in 1924 and in 1940 became an officer in the Durham Light Infantry.

He served as Member of Parliament for South West Hertfordshire from 1950 until his retirement in February 1974.

He was a strong believer in the European Union and a great supporter of the Commonwealth.

References

 Catalogue of the Longden papers at the Archives Division of the London School of Economics.

External links 
 

1902 births
1997 deaths
Conservative Party (UK) MPs for English constituencies
Knights Bachelor
UK MPs 1950–1951
UK MPs 1951–1955
UK MPs 1955–1959
UK MPs 1959–1964
UK MPs 1964–1966
UK MPs 1966–1970
UK MPs 1970–1974